Caroline Tamlyn (born 1955) is a British former swimmer.

Swimming career
Tamlyn won the British Championship over 200 metres breaststroke.

Tamyln represented England in the breaststroke, butterfly and medley events, at the 1974 British Commonwealth Games in Christchurch, New Zealand.

She swam for the Beckenham Ladies Swimming Club and was the 1970 Junior Champion of Kent.

References

1955 births
Living people
British female swimmers
Swimmers at the 1974 British Commonwealth Games
Female breaststroke swimmers
Female butterfly swimmers
Female medley swimmers
Commonwealth Games competitors for England